BD Cine ("Burman Dubcovsky Cine") is a film production company in Buenos Aires, Argentina.

The firm was formed in 1995 by producer/director Daniel Burman and producer Diego Dubcovsky.

According to film critic Joel Poblete, who writes for Mabuse, a cinema magazine, Daniel Burman and Diego Dubcovsky are two of the members of the New Argentina Cinema which began c. 1998.

Filmography
 Plaza de almas (1997)
 Un Crisantemo Estalla en Cinco Esquinas (1998)
 Garage Olimpo (1999)
 Esperando al Mesías (2000)
 Le Loup de la côte Ouest (2002)
 Todas Las Azafatas Van Al Cielo (2002)
 Nadar solo (2003)
 Lesbianas de Buenos Aires (2004)
 18-J (2004)
 El Abrazo Partido (2004)
 The Motocycle Diaries (2004)
 Como un avión estrellado (2005)
 Un Año sin amor (2005)
 Chicha tu madre (2006)
 Derecho de Familia (2006)
Tesis sobre un homicidio (2013)

Footnotes

Mass media companies established in 1995
Film production companies of Argentina